The Americas Zone was one of three zones of regional competition in the 2012 Fed Cup.

Group I
Venue: Graciosa Country Club, Curitiba, Brazil (outdoor clay)
Date: Week of 30 January

The nine teams were divided into two pools of four and five teams. The winners of both pools played off to decide which nation progresses to World Group II play-offs. Nations finishing in the bottom two places in each pool play-off to determine which nation was relegated to Americas Zone Group II for 2012.

Pools

Play-offs

 advanced to World Group II play-offs.

Group II
Venue: Club San Javier, Guadalajara, Mexico (clay, outdoors)
Date: 16–21 April

The nine teams were divided into one pool of four and one pool of five teams. The top two teams of both pools played off to decide which nation was promoted to the Americas Zone Group I for 2012.

Play-offs

See also
Fed Cup structure

References
 Fed Cup 2012, Americas, Group I
 Fed Cup 2012, Americas, Group II

External links
 Fed Cup website

 
Americas
Sport in Curitiba
Tennis tournaments in Brazil
Sport in Guadalajara, Jalisco
Tennis tournaments in Mexico
2012 in Mexican tennis
2012 in Brazilian tennis
21st century in Guadalajara, Jalisco
21st century in Curitiba